Prototroctes is a genus of New Zealand smelts containing one species native to Australia and another, now extinct, species that was native to New Zealand.

Species
There are currently two recognized species in this genus:
 Prototroctes maraena Günther, 1864 (Australian grayling)
 †Prototroctes oxyrhynchus Günther, 1870 (New Zealand grayling)

References

 
Freshwater fish genera
Taxa named by Albert Günther